This Is the One is the third English studio album by Japanese American pop singer-songwriter Utada, released by Island Records in the United States digitally on March 24, 2009 and physically on May 12, 2009. The album was originally set to be released in Japan on March 4 but was pushed back to March 14. The album was only released in North America, Japan and some parts of Asia. In Japan, the album topped the Oricon's International Album chart and peaked at number three on the Weekly chart. In the United States, the album peaked at number 69 on the Billboard 200 chart. This Is the One was the supporting album of Utada's 2010 tour Utada: In the Flesh 2010. On December 21, 2009, the "Dirty Desire" remixes were released.

This Is the One marked Utada's last album with Island Records, and the Universal Music Group at that time, not only due to the end of her contract, but also due to her 2010 global recording contract with EMI Music. All albums, regardless of language, will be released under "Hikaru Utada", thus also retiring her Western stage name, Utada. In 2013, EMI Music Japan merged with Universal Music Japan following the global merger between the two music groups. Thus, her sixth Japanese album, Fantôme, marks the last release with Universal Music Group as a whole before she moves to Epic Records Japan.

Background
On October 23, 2007, Utada wrote a message on her Japanese blog stating that she was writing and recording demos for her next English album while simultaneously completing her fifth Japanese studio album. During her interview with Ningin on February 3, 2009, Utada states that she wanted to make a mainstream album, and the result was a more R&B influenced album because that's what currently is mainstream.
In an interview with Kiwibox on February 20, 2009, Utada explains that the title of the album came about because she was going for a more mainstream sound for this record, and that it would be the "breakout" album.

Recording
Utada worked with various other artists on several tracks, including Stargate produced, prematurely published "Apple and Cinnamon" and sometime later at least one other track produced by Christopher "Tricky" Stewart. On January 9, her subject-exclusive blog indicated that she was nearing completion of the album, and said of the work involved, "If this were a live show, I'm at the painful part about two songs before the break for the encore." She also stated that, upon completion of the album production, she would post her first new English blog message of the year. Official Japanese and English press releases posted online January 22 confirmed that Utada had worked with producers Stargate and C. "Tricky" Stewart, and that the album's recording had taken place in New York, Atlanta, and Tokyo, and 10 songs were written (by her) for the project. In a blog post dated January 31, Utada mentioned that she had on that day decided on the sequence of songs and that the album was soon to be mastered. She also wrote that the title would soon be announced. Later, in an issue of Japanese magazine WHAT'S IN?, two more track titles were revealed ("Poppin'" and "Automatic Part II") as well as other significant tidbits of information regarding the upcoming release. It was reported that Utada was in the studio with Stargate for roughly one hour, while the majority of the rest of the album's production was completed separately by transfer of data between Japan, New York, and Norway.

Promotion

On February 3, Utada had a two-part interview with Ningin's Asian Media Online community to further promote her new music.  On February 6, Island Records took out an advertisement for Utada's first single "Come Back to Me" on radio industry news site FMBQ. On February 14, Utada had an interview with GossipGirls where she talked about the new concept for her This Is the One. On February 20, Utada had an interview with Kiwibox.com to further promote her upcoming album. On March 3, Asiance Magazine interviewed Utada about her upcoming album. Beginning March 18, Utada made radio tours in the West Coast to promote the album, stopping at radio stations in Seattle, Portland, Reno, Sacramento, San Francisco, and Los Angeles. Utada hosted listening parties at select Sephora beauty and cosmetics stores in Los Angeles on March 24, in New York on March 25, and in Miami on March 27 to further promote the album. On March 23, the music video for the lead single "Come Back to Me" was released as the 'Free Music Video of the Week' on the U.S. iTunes Store. On March 24, Utada performed "Come Back to Me", "Merry Christmas Mr. Lawrence - FYI", and "Me Muero" live on Los Angeles KTLA Morning News.  On March 28, Utada performed on the CBS program, The Early Show Saturday Edition.

On 21 December 2009, Utada released the "Dirty Desire" remixes. Although classed as a single, no music video was produced, nor was there much in way of promotional activities. This single was mainly to promote Utada's In the Flesh 2010 tour. The song peaked on the US Dance Club Songs chart at 16.

Critical reception
This Is the One received generally positive reviews. Adam Benjamin Irby of Bleu Magazine wrote "This Is the One is an exceptional album that will with the right promotion definitely breathe some life into what's becoming a stale pop music scene in America". Daniel Robson of The Japan Times panned the album, saying that by hiring the superproducers behind other successful acts, Utada "basically make her music as bland, accessible and predictable as possible". He noted some good songs on the album and said the album was "practically x-rated at times" due to songs like "Dirty Desire" and "Automatic Part II"; where she sings "During my 9 to 5, I'm thinking six and nine" and "Contraceptive, when I'm on it, it's automatic" on the respective songs.

Michael Botsford of AudioScribber gave the album six out of ten. He said the main issue with the album was its obvious influence from American R&B, commenting "[...]we were half expecting Fat Man Scoop to intercept the music and demand we put our hands in the air". He also wrote the album was an "undeniably cute and charming album", and "if she stopped aiming to please the mainstream, this album would have scored a higher rating". David Jeffries of AllMusic gave This Is the One a positive review, stating that "Utada the performer is clearly defined here with slick, polished production supporting her songs rather than dominating them", but that "most of her lyrics are riddled with clichés with plenty of 'whispers in the dark'". Jeffries also mentioned that "Big, behind-the-scene names like Chris "Tricky" Stewart and Antonio "LA" Reid point to the urban meets pop attitude of the album, but Utada will not be overshadowed. This album is hers alone and when placed next to Exodus, it's aptly titled".

Commercial performance
In Japan, This Is the One debuted at number three on the Oricon Weekly chart, selling 77,832 copies in its first week. On the Oricon Foreign Album chart the album debuted atop the chart and would stay at number one for six consecutive weeks. In America fueled by downloads alone, the album debuted on the Billboard 200 at number 178 and number six on the Top Heatseekers chart, selling 5,000 units. The album re-entered the Billboard 200 on the issue date of May 30, 2009, peaking at number 69 with 6,915 units sold and then fell to number 137 the following week with 3,873 units sold. However, the album overall did not outsell her debut album, Exodus, selling a total of more than 16,000 units in the United States alone (versus Exodus which sold more than 55,000 copies). This Is the One sold 300,000 units worldwide.

Track listing

Note
The standard version track list was released in countries like South Korea, Malaysia, Hong Kong, and others than the United States and Japan, with only ten tracks without the bonus tracks.

Japanese version
The Japanese version of This Is the One has a slightly altered track listing (in both physical and digital formats).
All songs written and produced by Utada; others who also worked on the album are given below.

Charts and sales

Weekly charts

Year-end charts

Sales

Release history

References

External links
 Utada.com

Hikaru Utada albums
Albums produced by Stargate
Albums produced by Tricky Stewart
Island Records albums
2009 albums